Kenneth Thomson (born 5 January 1947) is an Australian former cricketer. He played one first-class match for Tasmania in 1973/74.

See also
 List of Tasmanian representative cricketers

References

External links
 

1947 births
Living people
Australian cricketers
Tasmania cricketers
Cricketers from Hobart